Supaul district is one of the thirty-eight districts of Bihar, India. The town Supaul is the district's administrative headquarters. The district, which was split from the former Saharsa district on 14 March 1991, occupies .

History
Supaul, which was previously a part of Saharsa district, is now part of the Mithila region. Mithila first gained prominence after being settled by Indo-Aryan people, who established the Mithila Kingdom (also called Kingdom of the Videhas).

During the late Vedic period (c. 1100–500 BCE), Videha, along with Kuru and Pañcāla, became one of the major political and cultural centres of South Asia. The kings of the Videha Kingdom were called Janakas.
The Videha Kingdom was later incorporated into the Vajjika League, which had its capital in the city Vaishali, which is also in Mithila.

Geography
Supaul district occupies  and is bounded by Nepal to the north, Araria district to the east, Madhepura and Saharsa districts to the south, and Madhubani district to the west. Supaul district is a part of Kosi division. The Koshi River flows through the district, which is regularly affected when it floods.

Notable people
R K Singh, IAS is a former Indian bureaucrat served as Home Secretary to GoI and a member of the Indian Parliament since May 2014.
Syed Shahnawaz Hussain, BJP spokesperson and former Union Minister is also from Supaul.
Udit Narayan was born in the village of Baisi in the district of Supaul.
Sharda Sinha
Lalit Narayan Mishra
Govind Kumar Singh, a fashion designer
Prabesh Choudhary, a cyber security expert

Sub-divisions
The Supaul district comprises the following four sub-divisions:
Supaul Sadar
Birpur
Triveniganj
Nirmali

Blocks
There are a total  of eleven blocks in the Supaul District:
 Basantpur (Parts of Birpur Sub-division)
 Raghopur (Parts of Birpur Sub-division)
 Pratapganj (Parts of Birpur Sub-division)
 Supaul (Parts of Supaul Sadar Sub-division)
 Kishanpur  (Parts of Supaul Sadar Sub-division)
 Saraigarh-Bhaptiyahi (Parts of Supaul Sadar Sub-division)
 Pipra  (Parts of Supaul Sadar Sub-division)
 Triveniganj  (Parts of Triveniganj Sub-division)
 Chhatapur  (Parts of Triveniganj Sub-division)
 Nirmali  (Parts of Nirmali Sub-division)
 Marauna  (Parts of Nirmali Sub-division)

Politics

Supaul Lok Sabha is one of the 40 Lok Sabha (parliamentary) constituencies in Bihar state. This constituency came into existence in 2008 as a part of the implementation of delimitation of parliamentary constituencies based on the recommendations of the Delimitation Commission of India constituted in 2002.

  

|}

Economy
Agriculture is the major occupation of this district and rice is the main crop.

In 2006, the Ministry of Panchayati Raj named Supaul as one of the country's 250 most backward districts out of a total of 640. It is one of the 36 districts in Bihar that receive funds from the Backward Regions Grant Fund Programme (BRGF). From December 2012, Bivha International Child Fund has funded education in Supaul's Koshi division. Several programs are funded for education, agriculture from Bivha International School, Bivha Rural Development fund, national banks, NABARD, and World Bank.

There is also an egg farm, which produces approximately 20,000 eggs per day, which was established by M/S Koshi in Parsauni village.

Demographics

According to the 2011 census, Supaul district had a population of 2,229,076, roughly equal to the nation Latvia or the US state of New Mexico. This gives it a ranking of 204th in India (out of a total of 640) districts. Its population growth rate over the decade 2001–2011 was 28.62%. Supaul has a sex ratio of 925 females for every 1000 males and a literacy rate of 59.65%. 4.74% of the population lives in urban areas. Scheduled Castes and Scheduled Tribes make up 15.89% and 0.46% of the population respectively.

At the time of the 2011 Census of India, 76.31% of the population in the district spoke Maithili, 12.43% Hindi, 9.30% Urdu and 1.25% Bengali as their first language.

Urban and Rural Supaul

Supaul District urban population 2011 
According to the 2011 census, out of the total population of Supaul, 4.74 percent live in urban regions of the district. In total, 105,558 people lives in urban areas; there were 55,788 males and 49,770 females. The sex ratio in the urban region of Supaul district is 1,000 males to 892 females as per 2011 census data. The sex ratio of children in Supaul district was 1,000 males to 932 females in 2011. The child population (ages 0–6) in urban region was 17,654, of which there were 9,140 males and 8,514 females, comprising 16.38% of the urban population. The average literacy rate in Supaul district as per census 2011 was 72.74%; the rate in males was 80.78% and in females it was 63.64%. The exact figure of 63,939 people in the urban regions were literate, of which males numbered 37,684 and females numbered 26,255.

Supaul District rural population 2011 
As per 2011 census,  2,123,518 people, 95.26% of the population of Supaul district, live in rural areas and villages. of which 1,099,495 were male and 1,024,023 were female. In rural areas of the district, the sex ratio is 931 females per 1,000 males. If the sex ratio of children is 945 girls per 1,000 boys. The child population of six years or below was 419,703 in rural areas, of which 215,813 were male and 203,890 were female. Children comprise 19.63% of the district's rural population. The literacy rate in rural areas of Supaul district is 56.89% as per census data 2011. Male and female literacy stood at 69.03& and 43.82% respectively. In total, 969,344 people were literate, of which 609,988 were male and 359,356 were female respectively.<ref>></</ref>

Culture

 Rajbiraj (10 km towards north in Nepal, is a historic city which houses the famous 8th century Rajdevi Temple and close to Chinnamasta shakti Peeth. It also has lot of displays of the region's culture. It is just off the Kunauli border.
Vishnu Mandir, temple based on south Indian architecture and dedicated to lord Vishnu has become a major tourist destination in the district. This adds a south Indian essence to the Mithila culture of the area. It is situated on the national highway 106.

Transport

Supaul is well-connected to other cities by road with national highways 106 and 57 that pass through it. NH57 connects Supaul to major cities such as Silchar, Gauhati Siliguri, Forbesganj, Mujjafarpur, Gorakhpur, Lucknow, Ahmedabad and Porbandar. There are regular buses to the state's capital Patna and the national capital Delhi.

Rail transport is available across the district. The former narrow-gauge railway connecting to Saharsa and Forbesganj is currently undergoing conversion to broad gauge. It is planned to be connected to Forbesganj, Saharasa Darbhanga, Mujjafarpur, and numerous other cities.
 The former Prime Minister of India Atal Bihari Vajpayee prompted the foundation of New Kosi Mahasetu Bridge in 2002, which was washed away in heavy floods and the India-Nepal earthquake in 1934. Forbesganj, Saharasa and Raghopur - Saraigarh DEMU became first trains to cross this bridge.

See also
Sukhpur Dayodhi

References

External links
 Official website
 Supaul Information Portal

 
1991 establishments in Bihar
Districts of Bihar